Mozart Decoded is a 2008 documentary about the life of Wolfgang Amadeus Mozart produced by Sullivan Entertainment. The film was made as a follow up to Sullivan Entertainment's Magic Flute Diaries and uses a lot of the same visual material. The program premiered on December 20, 2008, on A-Channel in Canada.

Synopsis
A detailed look the life of Wolfgang Amadeus Mozart, Mozart Decoded starts with Mozart's upbringing and follows his life through his success and affiliations. A priority of this documentary is finding out what motivated Mozart's work and how organizations like the Freemasons impacted his most popular operas.

References

External links
MozartsMagicFlute.com - The official website of Sullivan series of Mozart movies

2008 films
Films directed by Kevin Sullivan
Documentary films about classical music and musicians
Cultural depictions of Wolfgang Amadeus Mozart
Films about pianos and pianists